Gary Brent Darnell (born October 15, 1948) is a former American football player and coach at the college level.  Darnell is native of Arkansas and an alumnus of Oklahoma State University, where he played college football.  A long-time defensive coordinator, Darnell was also previously the head coach at Western Michigan University and Tennessee Technological University, as well as the interim head coach at the University of Florida and Texas A&M University.

Playing career
Darnell attended Oklahoma State University as a personal management major and played as a linebacker for the Oklahoma State Cowboys football team.  As a senior in 1969, he earned All-Big Eight Conference honors. Darnell also holds the Big 8 single-game tackle record of 27 tackles against Arkansas in 1969. He earned a Bachelor of Arts degree in 1969 and again remained with the  Oklahoma State football team as a graduate assistant.

Assistant and interim head coaching career
In 1971, he was hired on a full-time basis as the linebackers coach.  He later joined the coaching staffs at Southern Methodist University and the University of North Carolina at Chapel Hill under the same position.

In 1978, Darnell became assistant head coach and defensive coordinator at Kansas State University.  Darnell and the new staff turned around a program that went 0–11 in 1977, taking them to the Independence Bowl in 1982, Kansas State's first bowl appearance.

In 1986, Darnell joined the staff of Al Groh at Wake Forest University as assistant head coach and defensive coordinator.  He spent two years with the Demon Deacons before accepting the same position at the University of Florida in 1988.  In each of his two seasons at Florida, his defenses ranked third nationally and first in the Southeastern Conference.  In the middle of the 1989 season, he took over for his fired predecessor, Galen Hall, as head coach at Florida, leading the Gators to a 3–4 record over the season's final seven games.

In 1990, he accepted a position under Lou Holtz at the University of Notre Dame as assistant head coach and defensive coordinator.  Darnell was replacing Barry Alvarez, who left to take the head coaching job at Wisconsin.  He later joined John Mackovic's staff at the University of Texas at Austin as assistant head coach and special teams coordinator in 1992.  Two years later, he moved from special teams to defensive coordinator, serving in that position through the 1996 season.  He then moved on to become Western Michigan University's head coach in 1997.

Texas A&M
Darnell was hired as the defensive coordinator at Texas A&M University by head coach Dennis Franchione for the 2006 season. Franchione had previously served as Darnell's offensive coordinator at Tennessee Tech in 1983 and 1984.  Inheriting a team that finished 107th in total defense and 97th in scoring defense, Darnell implemented a quick turnaround, with the 2006 team finishing 37th in total defense and 32nd in scoring defense.  A day after head coach Dennis Franchione resigned, A&M athletic director Bill Byrne named Darnell the interim head coach.  Darnell coached the Aggies in the 2007 Alamo Bowl, which was Darnell's 12th bowl to coach.

Head coaching career

Tennessee Tech
After his success at Kansas State, Darnell was hired as head coach at Tennessee Technological University in 1983 where his success as a defensive coach was not duplicated. In his three years with Tennessee Tech, Darnell compiled a 3–29 record.

Western Michigan
Darnell was hired in 1997 by Western Michigan University as head coach.  Inheriting a team that finished 2–9 in 1996, Darnell led a six-game turnaround to 8–3, the largest turnaround among NCAA teams in 1997.  Western Michigan entered the 1998 season with a seven-game winning streak, the fourth-longest in the nation.  The 1998 squad finished with a 7–4 overall record. In 1999, the Broncos clinched the Mid-American Conference West Division title on their way to a 7–5 overall record.  The following year, the Broncos repeated as West Division champions with the fourth-best scoring defense in the nation, were ranked as high as 27th in the national polls, and held an eight-game winning streak, the longest at Western Michigan in forty-one years.  For his efforts, Darnell was named the 2000 Mid-American Conference Coach of the Year.

Following the 2000 season, Darnell became a top candidate for several head coaching positions at BCS conference schools, including Missouri, North Carolina, Rutgers, and Oklahoma State.  He ultimately signed a five-year extension to remain at WMU.  Darnell's last four seasons at Western Michigan were less successful, with the team posting a combined 15–31 record and without a winning season. Darnell was fired after the 2004 season, and the remaining year left on his contract was bought out by the university.  Darnell spent the 2005 season out of coaching.  His career record at WMU was 46–46.

Head coaching record

See also
 List of Oklahoma State University people

References

Bibliography 

 Carlson, Norm, University of Florida Football Vault: The History of the Florida Gators, Whitman Publishing, LLC, Atlanta, Georgia (2007).  .
 McCarthy, Kevin M.,  Fightin' Gators: A History of University of Florida Football, Arcadia Publishing, Mount Pleasant, South Carolina (2000).  .

1948 births
Living people
American football linebackers
Florida Gators football coaches
Kansas State Wildcats football coaches
North Carolina Tar Heels football coaches
Notre Dame Fighting Irish football coaches
Oklahoma State Cowboys football coaches
Oklahoma State Cowboys football players
SMU Mustangs football coaches
Tennessee Tech Golden Eagles football coaches
Texas A&M Aggies football coaches
Texas Longhorns football coaches
Wake Forest Demon Deacons football coaches
Western Michigan Broncos football coaches
People from Scott County, Arkansas